The 1996 UEFA Champions League final was a football match played on 22 May 1996 between Ajax of the Netherlands and Juventus of Italy. The match ended in a 1–1 draw after extra time, forcing a penalty shoot-out, which Juventus won 4–2. It was the club's second triumph in the competition.

Route to the final

Match

Details

Aftermath
Although Juventus won the 1996 Champions League final, the victory remains controversial because of accusations of doping. The Juventus team has been accused of using erythropoietin (EPO) and the matter went to trial in 2004. In November 2004, club doctor Riccardo Agricola was given a 22-month prison sentence and fined €2,000 for sporting fraud by providing performance-enhancing drugs, specifically EPO, to players between 1994 and 1998, Leading hematologist Giuseppe d'Onofrio said that it was "practically certain" that midfielders Antonio Conte and Alessio Tacchinardi had taken EPO to overcome brief bouts of anemia, and that it was "very probable" that seven other players – Alessandro Birindelli, Alessandro Del Piero, Didier Deschamps, Dimas, Paolo Montero, Gianluca Pessotto and Moreno Torricelli – had taken EPO in small doses.

In April 2005, the Court of Arbitration for Sport gave the following advisory opinion, in part: "The use of pharmaceutical substances which are not expressly prohibited by sports law, and which cannot be considered as substances similar or related to those expressly prohibited, is not to be sanctioned by disciplinary measures. However, regardless of the existence or not of any judgement rendered by a State court, sports authorities are under the obligation to prosecute the use of pharmaceutical substances which are prohibited by sports law or any other anti-doping rule violation in order to adopt disciplinary measures." In December 2005, Agricola was acquitted of the charges by Turin's court of appeal. In March 2007, in the final verdict by the Supreme Court of Cassation, stated: "that in the years of 1994 to 1998 there was no ascertained positive case of doping substances by Juventus players, that the purchase of erythropoietin or its administration to the athletes of the club does not emerge from any act of the trial, and that the same expert had identified the possibility of an administration of erythropoietin in distant terms from the sure evidence ("very probable" and in two cases "practically certain"): it is that there fore, the judgement of probability and not of certainty, did not allow for a statement of responsibility." The verdict also went on to say: "In response to the conclusion taken, the territorial court notes that there were no deferred values higher than the limits set in the various antidoping protocols and that the situation of the Juventus players, both with reference to the average hematological values, and in relation to that of material balance, did not differ from the national average population.

See also
1973 European Cup final – contested by the same teams
1995–96 UEFA Champions League
AFC Ajax in European football
Juventus F.C. in European football

References

External links
1995–96 UEFA Champions League at UEFA.com
1995–96 UEFA Champions League at Rec.Sport.Soccer Statistics Foundation

Final
European Cup Final 1996
European Cup Final 1996
European Cup Final 1996
1996
European Cup Final 1996
European Cup Final 1996
1990s in Rome
May 1996 sports events in Europe
Sports competitions in Rome